Rocky Bushiri Kisonga (born 30 November 1999) is a professional footballer who plays as a centre-back for Scottish Premiership side Hibernian. He has previously played for K.V. Oostende and Norwich City, spending almost the entirety of his spell at Norwich on loan at other clubs. He was born in Belgium and represented that country in youth internationals, but is eligible to play for DR Congo.

Career

Oostende
Bushiri joined the youth academy of K.V. Oostende in 2012 after impressing in a provincial tournament representing Walloon Brabant. He signed his first professional contract with Oostende in June 2017, for two years. He made his professional debut in a 1-0 Belgian First Division A loss to KV Mechelen on 9 December 2017, becoming the youngest-ever debutant for Oostende.

Norwich City
On 3 July 2019, it was announced that Bushiri would join Norwich City on a four-year deal, initially linking up with the U23 squad. On 1 August 2019, Bushiri joined League One club Blackpool on a season-long loan deal. Bushiri scored his first goal for the club in a 1-0 win against Wolverhampton Wanderers U21s in an EFL Trophy tie on 5 November 2019.

On 30 June 2020, Bushiri went out on loan again, this time joining Mechelen on a season-long deal.

On 26 January 2021, Bushiri moved to Belgium side KAS Eupen, on a loan deal until the end of the season.

Hibernian
On 10 January 2022, Bushiri joined Scottish Premiership side Hibernian on loan for the remainder of the season, with an option to buy in the summer. His number of appearances during the loan triggered that option, and he signed a three-year contract with Hibs in June 2022.

After he played against Morton, whilst he was supposed to be suspended for receiving two cautions in earlier ties, Hibs were thrown out of the Scottish League Cup.

International career
Bushiri was born in Belgium and is of Congolese descent. He represented Belgium in youth internationals up to and including the under-21 level, but changed his international allegiance in March 2023 so that he could play for DR Congo.

Career statistics

References

External links
 
 UEFA Europa League Profile
 

1999 births
Living people
Belgian footballers
Belgium under-21 international footballers
Belgium youth international footballers
Belgian sportspeople of Democratic Republic of the Congo descent
Norwich City F.C. players
K.V. Oostende players
K.A.S. Eupen players
Blackpool F.C. players
Belgian Pro League players
Association football defenders
Belgian expatriate footballers
Expatriate footballers in England
Belgian expatriate sportspeople in England
Black Belgian sportspeople
Hibernian F.C. players
Expatriate footballers in Scotland
Scottish Professional Football League players
People from Duffel
Footballers from Antwerp Province